Nebria fulgida is a species of ground beetle in the Nebriinae subfamily that can be found in Russian autonomous republics such as Khamar-Daban, Buryat Republic, and East Sayan.

References

fulgida
Beetles described in 1847
Endemic fauna of Russia